Ayida-Weddo is a loa of fertility, rainbows, wind, water, fire, and snakes in Vodou, especially in Benin and Haiti. Ayida-Weddo is known as the "Rainbow Serpent". Variants of Ayida-Weddo's name include Aida-Weddo, Ayida-Wedo, Aido Quedo, and Aido Hwedo.

Family
Ayida-Weddo is a member of the rada family and a root or (Old French) racine loa. She is married to Damballa. She shares her husband with his concubine, Erzulie Freda.

Symbols and offerings
Ayida-Weddo's symbols are the rainbow and white paquet congo. Her ceremonial colors are white and green. Appropriate offerings to her  include white chickens, white eggs, rice, and milk. Her favorite plant is cotton.

Function and presentation
The Fon people of Benin believe the rainbow snake Ayida-Weddo, created to serve Nana Buluku, held up the heavens. The creature had a twin personality as the red part of the rainbow was male while the blue part was female. She is portrayed as a narrow green snake. Like Dambala, she lives in the sky as well as in all the trees, springs, pools, and rivers. In some West African mythology, Mawu the creator sent down Adanhu and Yewa from the sky with the rainbow serpent Ayida-Weddo.

"In the beginning there was a vast serpent, whose body formed seven thousand coils beneath the earth, protecting it from descent into the abysmal sea. Then the titanic snake began to move and heave its massive form from the earth to envelop the sky. It scattered stars in the firmament and wound its taught flesh down the mountains to create riverbeds. it shot thunderbolts to the earth to create the sacred thunderstones. From its deepest core it released the sacred waters to fill the earth with life. As the first rains fell, a rainbow encompassed the sky and Danbala took her, Ayida Wedo, as his wife. The spiritual nectar that they created reproduces through all men and women as milk and semen. The serpent and the rainbow taught humankind the link between blood and life, between menstruation and birth, and the ultimate Vodou sacrament of blood sacrifice."

She is syncretized with the Catholic figure of Our Lady of Immaculate Conception.

See also
Rainbow Serpent

References

External links 
 Anida Wedo

Fertility goddesses
Fire goddesses
Rainbows in culture
Snake goddesses
Voodoo goddesses
Water goddesses
Wind deities